The Nevola is a river in the Marche region of Italy. Its source is near Arcevia in the province of Ancona. The river flows northeast near Ostra Vetere and Corinaldo before entering the Misa north of Ostra.

References

Rivers of the Province of Ancona
Rivers of Italy
Adriatic Italian coast basins